The Eve is a 2018 Nigerian Romantic comedy movie written by Tunde Babalola, Tosin Igho and Martin Adieze. It is directed by Tosin Igho, a veteran director of videos for Musician such as D'banj, Terry G, Faze, Yung L, Aramide and Sammie Okposo and produced by Hauwa Allahbura and Femi Odugbemi  under the production company of Cut24 Productions The well musical romantic film stars Beverly Naya, Meg Otanwa, Ronke Oshodi, Hauwa Allahbur Efa Iwara, Adeolu Adefarasin, Kunle Remi, Mawuli Peter Gavorn and John Okafor (Mr Ibu)

Premiere 
The movie was premiered in Lagos, Nigeria on March 24, 2018 at the Day Dream Pool Club, Landmark Towers, Victoria Island. It was also shown nationwide on Easter Day (March 29).

Themes 
The movie is set around romantic and comedic love story that comically explores serious themes and also raise questions on trivial issues like weddings, marriage, sex, friendship, dating, cheating, celibacy, partying, and homosexuality.

Synopsis 
The story revolves around a young man, Funsho, who is at the verge of marrying his long time crush (Yewande) but also got attracted to another lady who showed up during his bachelor's party. Funsho's inability to deny the affection of the new lady became a suspense for the viewers.

Cast   
Adeolu Adefarasin	(Funsho), Hauwa Allahbura	(Uwa), Jagila Donatus	(Event Planner) Femi Durojaiye	(Father Paul), Michael Unome Ejoor (Kayode), 	Sixtus Ezeh	(Event Planner), Efa Iwara	(Ebere), Beverly Naya (Yewande), Uche Nwaefuna	(Bolanle), 	Uche Nwaezeapu (Rolex), Ronke Odusanya (Aunty Keh), John Okafor	(Uncle Festus), Ronke Oshodi Oke (Aunty Beatrice), Meg Otanwa (Alero), 	Kunle Remi (Audu), Francis Sule	 (Spencer), Toni Tones (Ngozi Emeka) Nwogu Victory Emeka (Event Planner)

References 

2018 films
Nigerian romantic drama films
Nigerian comedy films
Nigerian romantic comedy films
English-language Nigerian films